de Boor may refer to:

Carl R. de Boor (born 1937), German-American mathematician and professor emeritus 
De Boor's algorithm, a fast and numerically stable algorithm for evaluating spline curves in B-spline form
Carl Gotthard de Boor (1848–1923), German scholar of Byzantine studies
Helmut de Boor, German scholar of Germanic studies

See also
De Boer (disambiguation)
Boor (disambiguation)